Here are many different lists associated with snooker.

Lists of players
 List of snooker players, a list of professional players from all eras
 List of world snooker champions
 List of snooker players by number of ranking titles
 List of snooker world number ones
 List of snooker players with over 100 century breaks
 List of players who have had more than one maximum break
 List of snooker player nicknames

Results by season

Other lists
 Glossary of cue sports terms
 List of snooker referees
 List of snooker tournaments
 List of maximum breaks